The Neptunes are an American songwriting and production duo composed of Pharrell Williams and Chad Hugo, formed in Virginia Beach, Virginia, in 1992. Williams often provides additional vocals on records and appears in the duo's music videos, while Hugo tends to stay behind the scenes.

Since their inception, The Neptunes have produced songs for a multitude of artists, including Clipse, Beyoncé, Jay-Z, Kelis, N.O.R.E., Britney Spears, Justin Timberlake, Nelly, Ludacris, T.I., Robin Thicke, Gwen Stefani, and Snoop Dogg, among others. In 2009, Billboard ranked the Neptunes number one on their list of the top 10 producers of the decade. In January 2020, the Neptunes were announced to be inducted into the Songwriters Hall of Fame as a part of the 2020 class, and in May 2021, Hugo and Williams received Honorary Doctorates from Berklee College of Music and Boston Conservatory at Berklee.

History 
Williams and Hugo met at a summer camp for the school of the Gifted and Talented in Virginia Beach, Virginia, where Williams played drums and Hugo played tenor saxophone. Upon entering a local talent contest in 1992 as the Neptunes, they were discovered by Teddy Riley, whose studio was close to Williams' school. Through working with Riley, the Neptunes wrote Wreckx-n-Effect's 1992 song "Rump Shaker" while still in school. They also worked with Riley's group Blackstreet, co-writing the single "Tonight's the Night" from their self-titled debut album.

In 1998, the Neptunes produced New York City-based rapper Noreaga's single "Superthug". They also produced Ol' Dirty Bastard's 1999 single "Got Your Money" featuring singer Kelis, for whom they would entirely produce her debut studio album, Kaleidoscope (1999), and her 2001 album Wanderland. The Neptunes produced hip hop duo Clipse's album, Exclusive Audio Footage (1999), which was intended to be Clipse's debut album before eventually being shelved. In 2000, the Neptunes produced Jay-Z's single "I Just Wanna Love U (Give It 2 Me)" from his fifth studio album, The Dynasty: Roc La Familia, and Mystikal's "Shake Ya Ass", from his fourth studio album, Let's Get Ready.

In 2001, N.E.R.D. released their debut studio album, In Search of..., featuring production from the Neptunes. In the same year, the Neptunes gained their first worldwide hit with Britney Spears' single, "I'm a Slave 4 U", for her eponymous third studio album, Britney.

The Neptunes wrote and produced NSYNC's final single, "Girlfriend", then wrote and produced most of co-lead singer Justin Timberlake's debut solo album, Justified (2002), including lead singles "Like I Love You", "Rock Your Body", and "Señorita".

In 2003, the Neptunes released a compilation album, Clones, featuring songs and remixes from various Star Trak artists. The Neptunes won "Producer of the Year" at the 2004 Grammy Awards.

Discography

Albums

Singles

Awards and nominations 

The duo has received numerous awards, such as from the Grammy Awards, where they were nominated every year from 2004 to 2007. The Neptunes have received three Grammy Awards: Producer of the Year, Non-Classical, Best Pop Vocal Album for Justified and Best Rap Song for "Money Maker". Overall, the Neptunes have received six awards from eighteen nominations.

Billboard R&B/Hip-Hop Awards 
The Billboard R&B/Hip-Hop Awards are sponsored by Billboard magazine and held annually in December.

|-
|rowspan="2"| 2002 ||rowspan="2"| The Neptunes || Songwriter of the Year || 
|-
| Producer of the Year || 
|-
|rowspan="2"| 2003 ||rowspan="2"| The Neptunes || Songwriter of the Year || 
|-
| Producer of the Year || 
|-
| 2004 || The Neptunes || Producer of the Year || 
|-
| 2009 || The Neptunes || Producer of the Decade||

Grammy Awards 
The Grammy Awards are awarded annually by the National Academy of Recording Arts and Sciences of the United States.

|-
|rowspan="6"|  || The Neptunes || Producer of the Year, Non-Classical || 
|-
| Justified || Best Pop Vocal Album || 
|-
| "Frontin'" || Best Rap/Sung Collaboration || 
|-
|rowspan="2"| "Beautiful" || Best Rap/Sung Collaboration || 
|-
| Best Rap Song || 
|-
| "Excuse Me Miss" || Best Rap Song || 
|-
|rowspan="2"|  ||rowspan="2"| "Drop It Like It's Hot" || Best Rap Performance by a Duo or Group || 
|-
| Best Rap Song ||  
|-
|  || The Neptunes || Producer of the Year, Non-Classical ||  
|-
| 2006 || The Emancipation of Mimi || Best Contemporary R&B Album ||  
|-
|rowspan="2"|  || "Money Maker" || Best Rap Song || 
|-
| In My Mind || Best Rap Album ||

See also 
 The Neptunes production discography

References 

 
American musical duos
Record production duos
American songwriting teams
Hip hop duos
Record producers from Virginia
Songwriters from Virginia
Pharrell Williams
American contemporary R&B musical groups
American hip hop groups
American pop music groups
Grammy Award winners
Musical groups established in 1990
Musical groups from Virginia